Cyrtopodium cristatum is a species of orchid native to South America (Brazil, Venezuela, Colombia and the Guianas).

References

External links 

cristatum
Orchids of South America
Plants described in 1841